Modern Drama is a studio album by American jazz saxophonist Jane Ira Bloom. The album was released in 1987 by Columbia label. This is her fourth full-size release and the first one by the major label. Koch Jazz re-released the album in 1996. The album contains nine compositions written by Bloom.

Reception
Bill Shoemaker of JazzTimes stated "Modern Drama, originally issued on Columbia in ’87, was a pivotal recording for Jane Ira Bloom, as it debuted her use of live electronics to augment her sumptuous soprano saxophone sound... Her writing is strong, particularly on ballads like the poignant “More Than Sinatra,” and her playing is assured." AllMusic's Scott Yanow wrote, " In addition to her soprano and a bit of alto, Bloom makes creative use of live electronics. Key among her sidemen on these nine originals is keyboardist Fred Hersch. The music is explorative yet generally melodic and worth searching for." A reviewer of Audio noted, "This was obviously the right album for soprano saxophonist Jane Ira Bloom to make."

Track listing

Personnel
Jane Ira Bloom – soprano saxophone & live electronics, alto saxophone
Fred Hersch – piano, Hammond B3 organ
Ratzo Harris – bass, electric bass
Tom Rainey – drums
David Friedman – vibes, marimba, percussion
Isidro Bobadilla – percussion
Andy Seligson – tuba (track 4)

References

External links

Jane Ira Bloom albums
1987 albums
Columbia Records albums